The Houston Mayoral Election of 1989 took place on November 7, 1989. Incumbent Mayor Kathy Whitmire was re-elected to a fifth term. It was the last election of someone over three terms. (Before the Term Limits).

Candidates
Incumbent Mayor Kathy Whitmire
Former Mayor Fred Hofheinz
Ted Walker
Rosie Walker
Shelby Oringderff

Results

1989 in Houston
1989 Texas elections
Houston
1989
Non-partisan elections